The Diocese of Victoria Nyanza is a northern diocese in the Anglican Church of Tanzania: its current bishop is the Rt Revd Zephania Amosi Ntuza.

Notes

Anglican Church of Tanzania dioceses
Lake Victoria